The Donnersberg Railway is a branch line from Alzey to Kirchheimbolanden, which originally ran as far as Marnheim. Although it was once part of the main line from Kaiserslautern to Mainz, the Pfrimm Viaduct was blown up in 1945 during the Second World War between Kirchheimbolanden and Marnheim, disrupting the route. Plans to reinstate the main line with a new route came to nothing. Passenger services ceased on the remaining section of line in 1951, but were reactivated in 1999.

Literature

References

External links 

 RP-Eisenbahn, operator of the Donnersberg Railway

Standard gauge railways in Germany
Railway lines in Rhineland-Palatinate
Rhenish Hesse
Palatinate (region)
Donnersbergkreis
North Palatinate